Music Awards Ceremony (MAC) 2023, presented by Sky Music, was held on 25 and 26 January 2023 to recognize the best in the music of former Yugoslav countries. The ceremony took place at Štark Arena in Belgrade. Following a two-year break due to the COVID-19 pandemic, the third MAC was announced on 27 November 2022. The event for the first time included two nights, one focusing on pop, rock, folk, world, rap, and hip hop music, and the other for contemporary genres, like trap, drill, urban pop and pop-folk music. On January 20, Serbian actress Jelena Gavrilović and Croatian musician Tonči Huljić were announced as hosts for the first evening, and Serbian rappers Voyage and Mimi Mercedez as hosts for the second one.

Performances

Categories and nominees
Winners are listed first and are highlighted bold.

Public vote-based categories
The nominees for the public categories were announced from 20 December 2022. The award system for the categories below were based on the public vote through the official MAC website and YouTube channel. The second and final round of voting began on 23 January.

Other awards

References

2023 music awards
Music festivals in Serbia